Portrait of the Infante Don Carlos is a 1626/27 oil painting of Don Carlos of Spain (brother to Philip IV of Spain), produced by Diego Velázquez as one of the first paintings he produced during his stay in Madrid. It is now in the Prado.

Its subject is in a relaxed and elegant pose, wearing a black costume with grey braids and a thick gold shoulder chain with the Order of the Golden Fleece and holding a hat in his left hand and a glove in his right. The figure appears in the darkest point of the space and the artist added a 4 cm strip on each side to add to its sense of authoritarianism.

External links
Velázquez , exhibition catalog from The Metropolitan Museum of Art (fully available online as PDF), which contains material on this portrait (see index)

Don Carlos
Don Carlos
1626 paintings
Don Carlos
1620s in Spain
Don Carlos